Nicholas Shortill (born November 16, 1992) is a professional Canadian football linebacker for the Toronto Argonauts of the Canadian Football League (CFL).

Career 
He was drafted by the Montreal Alouettes with the 13th pick in the 2015 CFL Draft and played for the Alouettes in 35 games over two years. He was traded to the Hamilton Tiger-Cats where he spent three years with the team. Upon entering free agency, on February 11, 2020, Shortill signed with the Toronto Argonauts. He was placed on the suspended list on July 10, 2021.

He was raised in Nobleton, Ontario, and attended McMaster University where he played for four years for the McMaster Marauders football team.

References

External links
Toronto Argonauts profile

1992 births
Canadian football linebackers
Hamilton Tiger-Cats players
Montreal Alouettes players
Toronto Argonauts players
Sportspeople from King, Ontario
King City Secondary School alumni
McMaster University alumni
McMaster Marauders football players
Living people